Air Chief Marshal Makalandage Johnny Terrence "Terry" De Silva Gunawardena, VSV (-2014) was the 8th Commander of the Sri Lankan Air Force. 

Educated at Wesley College, Colombo, Gunawardena joined the Royal Ceylon Air Force on 31 December 1959 and was commissioned a pilot officer in 1961. He served as a squadron pilot in both the No 1 Squadron and No. 2 Squadron. He was one of the first pilots qualified in fighter jets, flying BAC Jet Provosts and MiG-17s. He served as Commanding Officer, No 2 Squadron and Commandant, Air Force Academy, China Bay. He attended RAF Staff College, Bracknell and National Defence College, New Delhi. He was appointed Chief of Staff of the SLAF in March 1986. On 1 August 1991 he was appointed Commander of the Air Force and promoted to the rank of Air Marshal. He reintroduced fighter jets to the SLAF by acquiring F-7 Skybolts and increased its light attack capability by acquiring FMA IA 58 Pucarás. He added Mil Mi-17 heavy transport helicopters to the SLAF fleet. His tenner saw the introduction of zonal commands in the SLAF. He retired on 16 February 1996 and was promoted to the rank of Air Chief Marshal. He was succeeded by Oliver Ranasinghe.      

He was married to Sherly Gunawardena, they had three children, Only Son Kamal Gunawardena, Two Daughters Suzanna Goonawardena and Jenny Bandaranaike. 
Grandson Kanishka Yohan Terrence Gunawardena(kamal Gunawardena’s Son). 
His brother Annesley Gunawardena and sister Reene Dias.

AIR CHIEF MARSHAL TERRENCE GUNAWARDENA

This was a born leader

By Dr. Nihal D. Amerasekera Source Sunday Times

Terrence cut a distinctive figure as a tall, well-built teenager at school.  He commanded much respect as the Senior Prefect in 1958. I can still picture him standing by the door closest to the stage at the great hall at Wesley College, the place reserved for the Head Prefect. As a schoolboy he spoke softly, threw no tantrums and dressed elegantly.

indexTerrence also was the soccer goal keeper during 1957/58 and his courageous keeping helped the school maintain a successful unbeaten season. Terrence won countless fans on the football field with his skill and sportsmanship. Honourable and modest, he often played hard but fair. His gutsy approach to the game was his hallmark.

He left school to join the Royal Ceylon Air Force where he appeared to breeze through life making new friends and advancing his career with an ease that left others spellbound. No single moment better encapsulated the character, talent and sheer charisma of Terrence Gunawardene than his meteoric rise to become the most powerful Airman in Sri Lanka when the country was at war. We could have predicted he would one day be a high ranking officer of the Armed Forces even while at school as he was a born leader, brave and fearless and had impeccable credentials.

Although a dire necessity, to lead the Air Force during the war was a thankless job. In all this, he did not worry too much about what people thought of him, so long as he was convinced of the correctness of a course of action. Terrence took on the most demanding job when his country needed him most and was ever willing to do it to the best of his ability.

Throughout his career he abhorred publicity and was rarely seen in the media.

He had the guts, determination, stamina and the energy to carry out his mission in life. But his high moral values, ethics and principles made him retire early in 1994 with the comment “I am tired of bloodshed and will seek a spiritual way of life”. Despite a long and distinguished career, Terrence declined a military funeral.

The death of his son Kamal earlier this year was a hard blow from which he never fully recovered.

He will always be remembered for his loyalty, dignity and humanity as one of the finest Air Chief Marshalls we have had.

References

Commanders of the Sri Lanka Air Force
Sri Lankan Air Chief Marshals
Sinhalese military personnel
Alumni of Wesley College, Colombo
Graduates of the RAF Staff College, Bracknell
National Defence College, India alumni